Timeless is a collaborative album, recorded and released by Brazilian artist Sérgio Mendes, and produced by American rapper, songwriter and producer will.i.am. The album was released in the UK on February 13, 2006 and in the US on February 14. The album features many neo soul and alternative hip hop guest artists, including John Legend, Q-Tip and Justin Timberlake. The album was produced entirely by will.i.am, and was released via Concord Records and the will.i.am Music Group. The album's lead single, "Mas que Nada", was featured on commercials for both Joga Bonito and Nike Football, as well EA Sports' NBA Live 07 and 2006 FIFA World Cup Germany video games. Two further singles were released from the album: "That Heat", and "Yes Yes Y'all". The album reaches across styles, combining neo soul, bossa nova, samba, hip hop, and even flavors of reggaeton.

Track listing

Charts

Weekly charts

Year-end charts

Certifications

References

2006 albums
Albums produced by will.i.am
Albums produced by Sérgio Mendes
Sérgio Mendes albums
Latin Grammy Award for Best Portuguese Language Contemporary Pop Album